Olivia Barber may refer to:
 Olivia Barber, an alternative name for Olivia Winters, a fictional character from the soap opera The Young and the Restless
 Olivia Barber (footballer), Australian rules footballer